Spencer Island is one of several uninhabited Canadian arctic islands in Nunavut, Canada located within James Bay. During surveys in James Bay, polar bears were sighted using the island for summer refuge.

References

Uninhabited islands of Qikiqtaaluk Region
Islands of James Bay